Club Sport Marítimo has a long history in Portuguese football. Although the club was excluded from participating in the national championships for several years, this article includes statistics and records recorded throughout the club's history.

Statistics

Seasons in all competitions

Key 

1D = 1 Division
2D = 2 Division
Pos = Final position
P = Games played
W = Games won
D = Games drawn
L = Games lost
GS = Goals score
GA = Goals against
Pts = Points

CP = Campeonato de Portugal (Championship of Portugal)
TP = Taça de Portugal (Portuguese Cup)
TL = Taça da Liga (Portuguese League Cup)
UEL = UEFA Europa League

» NOTES
 Club Sport Marítimo began participation in the national championship in 1973–74.
 Club Sport Marítimo began participation in the Taça de Portugal in 1939–40.
 The Taça da Liga tournament began in 2007–08.
 Last update: 31 May 2022

Top scorers by season 

» NOTES
 The data used is since the last promotion to the I League in 1985
 Last update: 31 May 2022

Top 10 goalscorers 

» NOTES
 The data used is since the last promotion to the I League in 1985
 A player's name in bold denotes active player
 Last update 28 May 2021

Top 10 appearances 
Competitive, professional matches only. Appearances as substitute (in parentheses) included in total.

» NOTES
 The data used is since the last promotion to the I League in 1985
 A player's name in bold denotes active player
 Last update 18 January 2016

International players

Portugal 

» NOTES
 Last update: 16 June 2015

Other nations 

» NOTES
 Last update: 26 November 2022

References 

C.S. Marítimo